The Clear Fork is a principal tributary of the Mohican River,  long, in north central Ohio in the United States. According to the Geographic Names Information System, it has also been known historically as "Clear Creek" and as "Clear Fork Mohecan Creek".

The Clear Fork rises in northeastern Morrow County and flows generally eastwardly through southern Richland and Ashland Counties, past the towns of Lexington, Bellville and Butler, and through Mohican State Park.

Upstream of Lexington, a 1949 dam causes the river to form Clear Fork Reservoir, which provides drinking water to the city of Mansfield.  In Ashland County, a 1936 U.S. Army Corps of Engineers dam causes the river to form Pleasant Hill Lake.

See also
List of rivers of Ohio

References

Rivers of Ohio
Rivers of Ashland County, Ohio
Rivers of Morrow County, Ohio
Rivers of Richland County, Ohio